Dallas Riordan  is a fictional character appearing in American comic books published by Marvel Comics. She first appeared in Thunderbolts #1 (April 1997).

Fictional character biography
Dallas Riordan's comic book family had a long storied history of being police officers. Dallas was once an NYPD officer and a soldier before she went into politics and became the aide to the mayor of New York. When the Thunderbolts arrived on the scene after the disappearances of The Avengers and the Fantastic Four, the mayor wanted to take advantage of the Thunderbolts publicity and chose to appoint Dallas as the liaison between his office and the new team of "heroes". Dallas was unaware that her new associates were super villains in disguise, plotting to use their newfound publicity to get security clearances that would allow them to take over the world.

Dallas quickly began a flirtation with Thunderbolt member Atlas and the two were dating when the group became exposed as villains. The Thunderbolts, led by Citizen V (by now Baron Helmut Zemo once again), soon made an attempt to take over the world. To save face, the mayor chose to blame Dallas for leading him astray and promptly fired her.

A short time later, Dallas was approached by Roger Aubrey of the V-Battalion and was offered the role of Citizen V (the original Citizen V was a Golden Age hero murdered by Helmut's father Baron Heinrich Zemo), their primary field agent. It turned out that Dallas's grandfather had worked for the original V-Battalion (the majority of which were slaughtered by Heinrich). He had served in World War II but stayed in Europe to help recreate the V-Battalion with Roger Aubrey and various others, leaving his wife and son, Jim Riordan, behind. Jim raised Dallas to be tough and encouraged her desire to be a police officer. Jim did not like the V-Battalion, but he presumably wanted his daughter to be trained in combat so that she would be prepared if she ever accepted a role in the V-Battalion (as was her right, being a descendant of a member).

Furious over the way her life had been destroyed by the Thunderbolts, Dallas decided to join the V-Battalion and became Citizen V. She became somewhat of a super-hero herself, first fighting Baron Zemo and then going up against the threat of the Crimson Cowl, who after knocking Citizen V unconscious, framed Dallas for being the leader of the Masters of Evil, which was all a set-up to throw the Thunderbolts off the trail of the real Crimson Cowl (Justine Hammer). Dallas was then arrested. Dallas was rescued from prison by the V-Battalion. She soon tried to track down the Crimson Cowl but instead found herself fighting the Imperial Forces of America (ironically, but unknown to her, they were funded by Baron Zemo). The V-Battalion ordered Dallas to assassinate Henry Peter Gyrich (who would become her co-worker in the Commission on Superhuman Activities several years later) because Gyrich and the CSA had been compromised by the nanite conspiracy spearheaded by Baron Strucker of HYDRA. Dallas refused and the V-Battalion sent their operatives to stop her from informing the Thunderbolts of their plans.

When Dallas returned to the United States, she tried to get help from the Thunderbolts but a battle broke out between the two groups and Dallas vanished in battle, kidnapped again by the Crimson Cowl. Dallas wound up in a prison base on the border of Symkaria and Latveria. She managed to find a means of escape but chose to confront the Cowl instead. The battle ended with her falling off a bridge and into a river. Dallas washed up in Latveria (the country led by Doctor Doom) and her back was crushed, requiring her to use a wheelchair for mobility. Dallas soon began to get visitations from her ex-boyfriend Erik (who had been killed by Scourge). Eventually Dallas was freed from Latveria by the Redeemers at which point she came back to the United States.

The Thunderbolts, who had previously disbanded, reunited during a battle with Graviton. Dallas reasoned that the ionic-powered Erik's visitations were similar to Wonder Man's visitations of the Scarlet Witch, who he used as an emotional anchor to tie him to the world after he had been killed. Erik didn't have a body to come back to and instead channeled his ionic energy into Dallas. In their ionic state, Dallas's body could walk and had various superpowers. Atlas re-joined the Thunderbolts to fight Graviton but after the battle, Erik and Dallas found themselves and their teammates marooned on Counter Earth. When they returned, the ionic energy recreated a powerless Erik Josten and Dallas retained a portion of the ionic energy. Thanks to the Fixer, Erik soon gained Pym Particle-related powers again.

Dallas joined the Thunderbolts as Vantage and chose to remain on the team to watch Zemo, who she could not trust. Eventually Helmut was scarred by a deranged Moonstone when trying to save Captain America. The Thunderbolts briefly disbanded and Erik asked Hank Pym to strip him of his new powers. Dallas and Erik broke up and Dallas took a job working for homeland security.

Erik soon re-joined the Thunderbolts despite being powerless. After an encounter with Genis-Vel, Erik became enraged and tapped into his ionic powers which somehow left Dallas paralysed again.

Dallas is currently a full-time member of the CSA and even helped organize the battle between the Thunderbolts and the new Avengers. Dallas and the CSA are apparently working with Zemo to save the world from the Grandmaster. Dallas does not trust Helmut, but gave him the benefit of the doubt.

Altered again by the Wellspring, during a battle against the Grandmaster in which he had to surrender his powers temporarily to Zemo, Josten was left stuck in a giant form, too heavy even to move and communicate. However he was able to send back some ionic energy to Dallas, restoring her legs. She offered jobs to Abner Jenkins and Fixer within the CSA.

During the Dark Reign storyline, Dallas Riordan appeared as part of senate sub committee questioning Norman Osborn about the recent Skrull invasion.

Powers and abilities
Dallas Riordan has no powers.

As Vantage, Dallas once possessed superhuman levels of agility and endurance. While sharing consciousness with Atlas, Vantage was charged with ionic energy and could grow to great heights, fire ionic blasts, create a protective energy field, and fly.

Notes
Dallas is not the granddaughter of John Watkins Sr, the original Citizen V, nor is she the granddaughter of Watkins's lover Paulette Brazee and the red-headed soldier she married after Watkins death. Dallas's father Jim Riordan was born to an American couple. Jim's father was a soldier in WWII who stayed in Europe after the war and helped recreate the V-Battalion in 1951, but he died soon afterwards. Jim's mother was left to raise her son alone. Dallas used the family history of John Watkins the 3rd as her cover story when she explained her origin to Captain America, but he immediately saw through the deception. JJ Watkins, the son of John Sr and Paulette and father to John Watkins the 3rd, is presumably unrelated to the Riordan family. Dallas was offered the mantle of Citizen V because of her grandfather's sacrifice in the early days of the reconstituted V-Battalion. The official handbook entry on Dallas Riordan is incorrect in these matters.

References

External links
 Dallas Riordan at Marvel.com
 Dallas Riordan at Marvel Wiki
 Dallas Riordan at Comic Vine

Marvel Comics female superheroes
Marvel Comics police officers
Marvel Comics superheroes
Fictional characters from New York City
Comics characters introduced in 1997
Characters created by Kurt Busiek
Characters created by Mark Bagley